Jesuit Communications Foundation (JesCom) is the media arm of the Philippine Province of the Society of Jesus. JesCom was founded in 1995 by the late Rev. Fr. James B. Reuter, S.J. It is based in the Jesuit Ateneo de Manila University in Quezon City. JesCom is involved in the production of audiovisual materials for evangelization and education.

Production
JesCom produces video and radio programs in the following areas:
Values and Religious Education
Philippine Culture and History
Socio-Political Issues

Jesuit Music Ministry

The Jesuit Music Ministry (JMM) is a Philippines-based producer and publisher of music for use in the liturgy of the Roman Catholic church. It also manages a group of artists and composers, whose works are widely used in the liturgy of the Holy Mass in the Philippines.

References

External links
Jesuit Music Ministry
Ateneo de Manila University

Philippine record labels
Music publications
Sheet music publishing companies
Record labels established in 1995
1995 establishments in the Philippines